Photinula is a genus of sea snails, marine gastropod mollusks in the family Calliostomatidae.

Species
Species within the genus Photinula include:
 Photinula coerulescens King and Broderip, 1831
 Photinula crawshayi E. A. Smith, 1905
 Photinula lahillei Ihering, 1902
 Photinula roseolineata E. A. Smith, 1905
 Photinula virginalis Rochebrune & Mabille, 1885
Taxon inquirendum
 Photinula solidula J. E. Cooper & Preston, 1910 
Species brought into synonymy
 Photinula achilles Strebel, 1908: synonym of Margarella achilles (Strebel, 1908)
 Photinula antipoda (Hombron & Jacquinot, 1854): synonym of Cantharidus antipoda antipoda (Hombron & Jacquinot, 1854) 
 Photinula blakei (Clench & Aguayo, 1938): synonym of Carolesia blakei (Clench & Aguayo, 1938)
 Photinula couteaudi Mabille & Rochebrune, 1889: synonym of Photinula coerulescens (P. P. King, 1832)
 Photinula decepta Odhner, N.H.J., 1924: synonym of Cantharidus antipoda antipoda (Hombron & Jacquinot, 1854) 
 Photinula expansa (G.B. Sowerby I, 1838): synonym of Margarella expansa (G.B. Sowerby I, 1838)
 Photinula gamma Rochebrune & Mabille, 1885: synonym of Photinastoma taeniatum (G. B. Sowerby I, 1825)
 Photinula halmyris Rochebrune & Mabille, 1885: synonym of Margarella violacea (P. P. King, 1832)
 Photinula impervia Strebel, 1908: synonym of Lissotesta impervia (Strebel, 1908) (original combination)
 Photinula paradoxa Mabille, 1885: synonym of Photinastoma taeniatum (G. B. Sowerby I, 1825)
 Photinula pruinosa Rochebrune & Mabille, 1885: synonym of Margarella pruinosa (Rochebrune & Mabille, 1885) (original combination)
 Photinula steineni Strebel, 1905: synonym of Margarella steineni (Strebel, 1905)
 Photinula suteri E. A. Smith, 1894: synonym of Cantharidus dilatatus (G. B. Sowerby II, 1870) (junior synonym)
 Photinula taeniata (G. B. Sowerby I, 1825): synonym of Photinastoma taeniatum (G. B. Sowerby I, 1825)
 Photinula viaginalis Rochebrune & Mabille, 1885: synonym of Photinula virginalis Rochebrune & Mabille, 1885 (incorrect original spelling)
 Photinula violacea (P. P. King, 1832): synonym of Margarella violacea (P. P. King, 1832)
 Photinula wacei Melvill & Standen, 1918: synonym of Margarella wacei (Melvill & Standen, 1918) (original combination)

References

External links
 Adams, H. & Adams, A. (1853-1858). The genera of Recent Mollusca; arranged according to their organization. London, van Voorst
 Adams, A. (1853). Contributions towards a monograph of the Trochidae, a family of gasteropodous Mollusca. Proceedings of the Zoological Society of London. (1851) 19: 150-192
  Ihering, H. von. (1902). Die Photinula-Arten der Magellan Strasse. Nachrichtsblatt der Deutschen Malakozoologischen Gesellschaft. 34: 97-104
 

Calliostomatidae